Ilusión is a 2007 album by Edurne. It reached No. 13 on the Spanish albums chart.

Track listing

References

2007 albums